The 79th Delaware General Assembly was a meeting of the legislative branch of the state government, consisting of the Delaware Senate and the Delaware House of Representatives. Elections were held the first Tuesday after November 1st and terms began in Dover on the first Tuesday in January. This date was January 2, 1877, which was two weeks before the beginning of the third administrative year of Governor John P. Cochran.

Currently the distribution of the Senate Assembly seats was made to three senators for each of the three counties.  Likewise the current distribution of the House Assembly seats was made to seven representatives for each of the three counties.  The actual population changes of the county did not directly affect the number of senators or representatives at this time. 

In the 79th Delaware General Assembly session both chambers had a Democratic majority.

Leadership

Senate
 John T.  Moore, Sussex County, Democratic

House of Representatives
 Hugh Martin, Sussex County, Democratic

Members

Senate
Senators were normally elected by the public for a four-year term; although many were selected to fill the remainder of a vacant position.

House of Representative
Representatives were elected by the public for a two-year term.

References

v

Places with more information
Delaware Historical Society; website; 505 North Market Street, Wilmington, Delaware 19801; (302) 655-7161
University of Delaware; Library website; 181 South College Avenue, Newark, Delaware 19717; (302) 831-2965

7 079
1870s in Delaware